Ernesto Alexis Vega Rojas (born 25 November 1997) is a Mexican professional footballer who plays as a winger for Liga MX club Guadalajara and the Mexico national team.

Club career

Toluca
Vega made his senior team debut on 27 February 2016 coming on as a  substitute in a home league match against Pachuca. On April 5 he scored his first professional goal for Toluca in the Copa Libertadores against Ecuadorian club L.D.U. Quito, the game ended 2–1 and Toluca qualified to the tournament's Round of 16. On 16 April, Vega scored his first two goals in the league against Veracruz.

Guadalajara
On 8 December 2018 it was announced that Vega was joining Guadalajara for a reported $9 million, making his transfer one of the most expensive in the history of the club.

After playing six games without any goals and going three straight games without any wins on 16 February 2019 Vega managed to score 3 goals in the 3–0 victory against town rivals Atlas, his first career hat-trick.

Prior to the start of the 2021–22 season, Vega was given the number 10 jersey.

International career

Youth
Vega was called up by Jaime Lozano to participate at the 2020 CONCACAF Olympic Qualifying Championship, scoring one goal in five appearances, where Mexico won the competition. He was awarded the Golden Ball for best player and included in the tournament's Best XI. He was subsequently called up to participate in the 2020 Summer Olympics. Vega won the bronze medal with the Olympic team.

Senior
Vega made his senior national team debut on 26 March 2019 under Gerardo Martino in a friendly against Paraguay, as a 78th-minute substitute for Javier Hernández.

In May 2019, Vega was included in the provisional 2019 CONCACAF Gold Cup roster and was subsequently included in the final list. In the first group stage match against Cuba, he would score his first goal with the national team in a 7–0 thrashing. Mexico would go on to win the tournament.

In October 2022, Vega was named in Mexico's preliminary 31-man squad for the 2022 FIFA World Cup, and in November, he was ultimately included in the final 26-man roster.

Career statistics

Club

International

International goals
Scores and results list Mexico's goal tally first.

Honours
Mexico U23
CONCACAF Olympic Qualifying Championship: 2020
Olympic Bronze Medal: 2020

Mexico
CONCACAF Gold Cup: 2019

Individual
CONCACAF Olympic Qualifying Championship Golden Ball: 2020
CONCACAF Olympic Qualifying Championship Best XI: 2020
Liga MX All-Star: 2021, 2022

References

External links
 
 

1997 births
Living people
Liga MX players
Deportivo Toluca F.C. players
C.D. Guadalajara footballers
Association football wingers
Footballers from Mexico City
Mexican footballers
Mexico international footballers
2019 CONCACAF Gold Cup players
CONCACAF Gold Cup-winning players
Footballers at the 2020 Summer Olympics
Olympic footballers of Mexico
Olympic medalists in football
Olympic bronze medalists for Mexico
Medalists at the 2020 Summer Olympics
2022 FIFA World Cup players